John William Noell (February 22, 1816 – March 14, 1863) was a U.S. Representative from Missouri, father of Thomas Estes Noell.

Born in Bedford County, Virginia, Noell attended the rural schools there. At the age of seventeen, he settled near Perryville, Missouri. He engaged in milling and storekeeping, studied law, was admitted to the bar in 1843, and commenced practice in Perryville. He served as clerk of the circuit court for Perry County in 1841–1850. He was elected to the state senate, and served in 1851–1855.

Noell was elected U.S. Representative as a Democrat in 1858, to the Thirty-sixth Congress, re-elected in 1860 to the Thirty-seventh Congress, and re-elected as an Unconditional Unionist to the Thirty-eighth Congress in 1862. He served from March 4, 1859, until his death on March 14, 1863, in Washington, D.C. He was interred in St. Mary's Cemetery, in Perryville.

See also
List of United States Congress members who died in office (1790–1899)

References

1816 births
1863 deaths
People from Bedford, Virginia
Missouri Unconditional Unionists
Democratic Party members of the United States House of Representatives from Missouri
Unconditional Union Party members of the United States House of Representatives from Missouri
Democratic Party Missouri state senators
19th-century American politicians
People from Perryville, Missouri